Sabayevo (Sabay) is a rural locality (a selo) and the administrative centre of Sabayevsky Selsoviet, Buzdyaksky District, Bashkortostan, Russia. The population was 732 as of 2010. There are 10 streets.

Geography 
Sabayevo is located 38 km north of Buzdyak (the district's administrative centre) by road. Stary Shigay is the nearest rural locality.

References 

Rural localities in Buzdyaksky District